The Obelis is a river of Ukmergė district municipality and Kėdainiai district municipality, central Lithuania. It is a left tributary of the Nevėžis near Kėdainiai.

The river valley is 200–220 m wide and 8–14 m high. The width of the river course is 5–12 m. The rapidness of the current is 0,2–0,3 meters per second. There are Kapliai Reservoir, Bubliai Reservoir and Juodkiškiai Reservoir dammed on the Obelis river. It flows through Paobelys, Šėta, Aukštieji Kapliai, Aristava, Paobelys, and meets the Nevėžis in Kėdainiai.

The river name Obelis derives from the Lithuanian word obelis ('apple tree').

References

Rivers of Lithuania
Kėdainiai District Municipality
Ukmergė District Municipality